The men's 5000 metres at the 1950 European Athletics Championships was held in Brussels, Belgium, at Heysel Stadium on 24 and 26 August 1950.

Medalists

Results

Final
26 August

Heats
24 August

Heat 1

Heat 2

Participation
According to an unofficial count, 16 athletes from 11 countries participated in the event.

 (1)
 (2)
 (1)
 (1)
 (2)
 (2)
 (1)
 (2)
 (1)
 (1)
 (2)

References

5000 metres
5000 metres at the European Athletics Championships